KPH or kph may refer to:

Healthcare 
 Kingston Public Hospital in Jamaica

Politics 
 Campaign Against Homophobia (Polish: Kampania Przeciw Homofobii), LGBT support organisation in Poland
 Croatian Communist Party (Komunistička partija Hrvatske)

Science and technology 
 KPH (radio station), California, US
 Keystrokes per hour in data entry
 Kilometres per hour

Geography 
 Kesatuan Pemangku Hutan, a cultural heritage in Kedungbanteng, Indonesia

Aviation 

 Kazan Helicopters, ICAO airline code
 Pauloff Harbor, Alaska, US, FAA LID

Other 
 "Kidney, pelvic and heart fat" in marbled meat
 Kplang language of Ghana,ISO 639-3 code
 Ketapang Management District office, which manages the Ketapang Forest area